Lane Caudell (born April 25, 1952) is an American actor and singer-songwriter who appeared in the films Goodbye, Franklin High, and Hanging on a Star and played Woody King on the NBC daytime soap opera Days of Our Lives (1982–1983).

Caudell works as a music publisher for Cauley Music Group in Nashville, Tennessee. He is the father of actor-musician Lane Toran.

Filmography

Film and television
Caudell had roles several minor films for the teenage market in the 1970s, including the lead role in the musical film Hanging on a Star, in which "a big rubbery Lane Caudell arises on a swampy stage and sings in a bubblingly oily voice."  Caudell had the starring role in The Archer, a fantasy with swords and sorcerers.  Caudell's character, Toran of the Hawk Clan, has been framed for the murder of his father, Chief Brakus.

Hal Erickson praised his performance in Goodbye, Franklin High."

In her 1987 memoir Confessions of a Groupie: I'm with the Band, Pamela Des Barres describes Caudell as having given up show business, "after playing a caveman in a TV movie and a brief stint on Days of Our Lives."

Soundtrack

Discography

Albums

Singles

References

External links

1952 births
Living people
American male film actors
American male television actors
American male singer-songwriters
American male pop singers
American pop rock singers
American music publishers (people)
MCA Records artists
Male actors from North Carolina
Singer-songwriters from North Carolina
People from Asheboro, North Carolina
20th-century American male actors